The 2012 FIBA Europe Under-16 Championship for Women was the 24th edition of the FIBA Europe Under-16 Championship for Women. 16 teams participated in the competition, held in Miskolc, Hungary, from 12 to 22 July 2012. Spain won their eighth title.

Participating teams

  (Runners-up, 2011 FIBA Europe Under-16 Championship for Women Division B)

  (Winners, 2011 FIBA Europe Under-16 Championship for Women Division B)

First round
In the first round, the teams were drawn into four groups of four. The first three teams from each group will advance to the second round (Groups E and F) and the last teams will advance to the 13th–16th place classification (Group G).

Group A

Group B

Group C

Group D

Second round
In the second round, the teams play in two groups of six. The first four teams from each group will advance to the Quarterfinals and the other teams will advance to the 9th–12th place playoffs.

Group E

Group F

13th–16th place classification

Group G

9th–12th place playoffs

Championship playoffs

Final standings

References

2012
2012–13 in European women's basketball
2012–13 in Hungarian basketball
International youth basketball competitions hosted by Hungary
International women's basketball competitions hosted by Hungary
Sport in Miskolc
2012 in youth sport